Vladislava Kucherova (born 21 October 1972), better known by the pen name Lada Luzina, is a Ukrainian author and former journalist. Nicknamed the "Kyiv Witch", she writes novels in Russian within the crime and fantasy genres.

Biography 
Luzina was born on 21 October 1972 in Kyiv, Ukrainian Soviet Socialist Republic. Her parents divorced when she was four years old.

Eventually, she began to user her mother's maiden name, Luzina, as a pseudonym.

After the 8th grade, her mother took Luzina to an architectural school, the Vocational School No. 18, after which she worked in construction. She later entered the Faculty of Theater Criticism of the Kyiv Theater Institute. Starting her freshman year, her articles and poems began to be printed in various publications.

After leaving school, Luzina began her career as a tabloid journalist, which earned her the nickname "scandal journalist".

Writing 
Luzina stories are mainly set in Kyiv, where she lives and works, and typically follow the urban fantasy genre. She began her book career in 2002, when she self-published her first book, My Lolita.

Initially planned as a trilogy, her "Witches of Kyiv" series began in 2005, when the book Sword and Cross was published. The series is of the crime and fantasy genre. Thematically, it focuses on questions around the cultural identity of Kyiv as it sits between Russia and Ukraine.

The publisher originally announced that the third and final book of the series, The Master's Recipe, was planned to be released in the fall of 2011. The first eight chapters of the book were uploaded onto Luzina's website, but by 2014, the book had still not been published. Instead, three different novels from the series were released in 2011.

In 2014, Luzina wrote a book titled Kak ja byla skandal'noj žurnalistkoj (How I was a Scandalous Journalist). Her 2020 urban fantasy book, Demons of Vladimirskaya Gorka, was based on Kyiv's historical plague and cholera epidemics.

Personal views

Russia 
Luzina has stated that Ukraine, Belarus and Russia all come from Kievan Rus', and has called Russia "Ukraine's daughter."

Awards and honors 
Luzina's book Shot at the Opera, the second in her "Witches of Kyiv" series, was awarded “Best Ukrainian Book” in 2008.

In 2010, Luzina was included in the list of "Top 10 most successful writers of Ukraine" according to  magazine, which estimated the total book circulation of the writer sold in Ukraine between 1992 and 2010 to be about 250 thousand copies. In 2012, she was included in the ranking of the top 30 most successful writers of Ukraine, according to the magazine Focus. In 2012, the writer received the  literary award.

Selected bibliography 
 My Lolita — Kharkiv: , 2002 — 
 I Am a Witch! —Kharkiv: Folio, 2003. — 
 How I was a Scandalous Journalist — Kharkiv: Folio, 2004 — 
 Sex and the City of Kyiv — Kharkiv: Folio, 2004 — 
 My Corpse — Kharkiv: Folio, 2009. — 
 Zhadan S. V. (Russian: Жадан С. В. Палата No.7) — Kharkiv: Folio, 2013.—

"Kiev Witches" series 

 Sword and Cross — Kharkiv: Folio, 2005 — 
 Shot at the Opera — Kharkiv: Folio, 2007 — 
 Save the Emperor!, Book 1 — Kharkiv: Folio, 2011 — 
 Master's Recipe. Save the Emperor!, Book 2 — Kharkiv: Folio, 2011 — 
 Dream Princess — Kharkiv: Folio,  2011 — 
 Nikola Wet — Kharkiv: Folio, 2011 — 
 Angels of the Abyss — Kharkiv: Folio, 2011 — 
 Stone Guest — Kharkiv: Folio, 2011 — 
 Ice Princess — Kharkiv: Folio, 2015 — 
 Shadow of the Demon — Kharkiv: Folio, 2016 — 
 Jack the Ripper from Khreshchatyk — Kharkiv: Folio, 2018 — 
 Demons from Vladimirskaya Gorka — Kharkiv: Folio, 2020 —

Books about Ukraine 

 Magical Kyiv — Kharkiv: Folio, 2016 — 
 Legends of Kyiv — Kharkiv: Folio, 2016 — 
 Wonders of Kyiv — Kharkiv: Folio, 2016 — 
 Increible Kyiv — Kharkiv: Folio, 2018 — 
 Ukrainian Women's Magic Traditions — Kharkiv: Folio, 2018 — ; English version: Glagoslav Distribution, 2020 —

Children's books 

 Good Tales About Christmas Toys — Kharkiv: Folio, 2012 — 
 Tale of the Light Bulb — Kharkiv: Folio, 2013 — 
 The Story of the Christmas Tree— Kharkiv: Folio, 2013 —

Screen adaptations 
In 2007 and 2008, the Ukrainian and Russian films Masha and the Sea (Masha i more) were released based on the story of the same name from Luzina's book I am a witch!

References 

Ukrainian women journalists
Pseudonymous writers
Ukrainian fantasy writers
Ukrainian women writers
Commons category link is on Wikidata
Kyiv National I. K. Karpenko-Kary Theatre, Cinema and Television University alumni
1972 births
Urban fantasy writers
Writers from Kyiv
Ukrainian journalists
Ukrainian writers in Russian
Living people